2F-QMPSB (SGT-13) is an arylsulfonamide-based synthetic cannabinoid that is a fluorinated derivative of QMPSB and has been sold as a designer drug. Its identification was first reported by a forensic laboratory in Italy in January 2019, and it was made illegal in Latvia shortly afterwards. Fluorination of the tail group is a common strategy to increase potency at cannabinoid receptors which is seen in many related series of compounds.

See also 
 AZD1940
 FUB-PB-22

References 

Arylsulfonamides
Cannabinoids
Designer drugs
Piperidines
Quinolines